The 2014 UCI World Tour was the sixth edition of the ranking system launched by the Union Cycliste Internationale (UCI) in 2009. The series started with the opening stage of the Tour Down Under on 21 January, and concluded with the final stage of the Tour of Beijing on 14 October.

After winning the 2008 UCI ProTour, Spain's Alejandro Valverde won his first World Tour individual points title, amassing 686 points over the course of the season. In the teams' rankings,  finished top for the second year running, with a total of 1440 points. Second place went to the  after taking overall victories in two of the season's last three races, while  finished in third position. The nations' rankings was comfortably headed by Spain, with a points advantage of 764 over Italy.


Teams

The UCI ProTeams competed in the World Tour, with UCI Professional Continental teams, or national squads, able to enter at the discretion of the organisers of each event.

Events
All events from the 2013 UCI World Tour were included.

Notes

Final standings

Individual

Riders tied with the same number of points were classified by number of victories, then number of second places, third places, and so on, in World Tour events and stages.

 236 riders scored points. 43 other riders finished in positions that would have earned them points, but they were ineligible as members of non-ProTour teams.

Team

Team rankings were calculated by adding the ranking points of the top five riders of a team in the table, plus points gained in the World Team Time Trial Championship (WTTT).

Nation

National rankings were calculated by adding the ranking points of the top five riders registered in a nation in the table. The national rankings were also used to determine how many riders a country could have in the World Championships.

 Riders from 34 countries scored points.

Leader progress

References

External links

 
UCI World Tour
2014 in men's road cycling